Generally Accepted Privacy Principles (GAPP) is a framework intended to assist Chartered Accountants and Certified Public Accountants in creating an effective privacy program for managing and preventing privacy risks. The framework was developed through joint consultation between the Canadian Institute of Chartered Accountants (CICA) and the American Institute of Certified Public Accountants (AICPA) through the AICPA/CICA Privacy Task Force. It is a component of SOC 2.

The GAPP framework was previously known as the AICPA/CICA Privacy Framework, and is founded on a single privacy principle: personally identifiable information must be collected, used, retained and disclosed in compliance with the commitments in the entity's privacy notice and with criteria set out in the GAPP issued by the AICPA/CICA. This privacy objective is supported by ten main principles and over seventy objectives, with associated measurable criteria. The ten principles are:

 Management
 Notice
 Choice and consent
 Collection
 Use, retention and disposal
 Access
 Disclosure to third parties
 Security for privacy
 Quality
 Monitoring and enforcement

Privacy is defined in Generally Accepted Privacy Principles as "the rights and obligations of individuals and organizations with respect to the collection, use, retention, disclosure, and disposal of personal information."

See also 
 Right to privacy
 SOC 2

References

External links 
 Fill the GAPP, Cal CPA magazine, Oct 2007
 Review and Critique of GAPP, Society of Information Risk Analysts Feb 2014
 GAPP Targets Privacy Risks, Journal of Accountancy
 Comparison of eight Governance Risk Control (GRC) Regulatory Compliances

Identity documents
Privacy
Personal life
Data security
Accounting terminology